Neal M. Coulter (born January 2, 1963) is a Canadian retired ice hockey right winger. He played 26 games in the National Hockey League for the New York Islanders between 1985 and 1988. The rest of his career, which lasted from 1983 to 1988, was spent in various minor leagues.

Coulter was born in Toronto, Ontario. As a youth, he played in the 1976 Quebec International Pee-Wee Hockey Tournament with a minor ice hockey team from London, Ontario.

Career statistics

Regular season and playoffs

References

External links
 

1963 births
Living people
Canadian ice hockey right wingers
Indianapolis Checkers players
Indianapolis Checkers (CHL) players
New York Islanders draft picks
New York Islanders players
Springfield Indians players
Ice hockey people from Toronto
Toledo Goaldiggers players
Toronto Marlboros players